Alice in Wonderland is the third musical album of K3. The album features all 15 songs from the musical Alice In Wonderland, in which K3 stars. The musical itself is very loosely based on the Alice-books by Lewis Carroll. On the album and in the musical are also a few songs sung by Jacques Vermeire as the white rabbit, Koen Krucke as the Caterpillar and the Madhatter and Nicole & Hugo as the heartking and Heartqueen, as well  as Tweedle-Dee and Tweedle-Dum.

Track listing

K3 (band) albums
2011 albums